Khutawyre Wegaf (or Ugaf) was a pharaoh of the Thirteenth Dynasty of Egypt, who is known from several sources, including a stele and statues. There is a general known from a scarab with the same name, who is perhaps identical with this king.

Attestations
A king with the name Khutawyre appears in the Turin King List as the first ruler of the Thirteenth Dynasty of Egypt. However, some researchers—especially Kim Ryholt—argue that the writer of the king list confused the name Khutawyre with that of Sekhemre Khutawy Sobekhotep and consequently placed Wegaf as the first pharaoh of the Thirteenth Dynasty when he should have been placed in the middle of it. In particular, Sekhemre Khutawy Sobekhotep is regarded by Ryholt and other Egyptologists, including Darrell Baker, as the first pharaoh of the Thirteenth Dynasty and a son of Amenemhat IV.

At Abydos, a stele dated to a regnal Year 4 and dedicated to preserving the procession road in the area of Wepwawet (Egyptian Museum JE 35256) was usurped by Neferhotep I, but Anthony Leahy suggested that it was originally issued by Wegaf, an opinion shared by Darell Baker but not by Ryholt, who rather suggested that the original issuer of the stela was more likely another pharaoh of the Thirteenth Dynasty, Seth Meribre.

References

Bibliography
 K.S.B. Ryholt, The Political Situation in Egypt during the Second Intermediate Period, c.1800-1550 BC (Carsten Niebuhr Institute Publications, vol. 20. Copenhagen: Museum Tusculanum Press, 1997).

18th-century BC Pharaohs
Pharaohs of the Thirteenth Dynasty of Egypt